is a Japanese television series produced by Tsuburaya Productions and a sequel to Ultraman Ginga, as well as part of the New Ultraman Retsuden programming block on TV Tokyo. It is the 26th entry in the Ultra Series.

Story

After two years Ultraman Ginga left Earth, and Hikaru returns to Japan once again after gaining a strange vision during his adventure in Mexico. Once he's arrived, he discovered a new threat in the form of Alien Chibull Exceller, an alien who steals , Android One-Zero, his android enforcer and his alien minions.

Hikaru was dragged into the battle again after being recruited into UPG (Ultra Party Guardians), an attack team formed by the International Defense Forces after various paranormal incidents. He reunites with Ultraman Ginga and joins forces with Sho to take down Exceller and his minions.

As the series progressed, it was revealed that Exceller's true agenda is to revive Dark Lugiel from the moon, desiring his body to take over the galaxy. He has revived once again as Victor Lugiel after fusing himself with the UPG's Victorium Cannon, their ultimate weapon but halfway through the invasion, the real Dark Lugiel reveals himself, kills Exceller, and contemplates restarting his plan to freeze all lifeforms. He was defeated once again by Ultraman Ginga and Ultraman Victory, after Exceller's former android One-Zero sabotages Victor Lugiel's inner system at the cost of her own. After the battle, Taro leave the Earth once more and Hikaru and Sho parted ways.

Episodes

Film

 premiered on March 15, 2015. Chronologically, it takes place between the final episode and Ultra Fight Victory.

Cast
: 
: 
: 
: 
: 
: 
: 
: 
: 
: 
: 
: 
: 
, : 
: 
: 
: 
Ginga Spark Voice:

Guest cast

: 
: 
: TAKERU
: 
:

Songs
Opening theme

Lyrics & Composition: 
Arrangement: Toshihiko Takamizawa with 
Artist: The Alfee
Episodes: 1-8 (Verse 1), 9-16 (Verse 2)
Ending theme

Artist: Voyager feat. Ultraman Ginga (Tomokazu Sugita)
Episodes: 1-8 (Verse 1), 9-16 (Verse 2)
Insert theme

Lyrics: 
Composition & Arrangement: Takao Konishi
Artist: Voyager
Episodes: 1, 2, 4, 10

Lyrics: , Sei Okazaki
Composition & Arrangement: Takao Konishi
Episodes: 1, 3, 15

Artist: Chigusa Kuno (Kirara) feat. Voyager
Episodes: 12, 13, 16

International broadcast
In the United States, the show aired on Toku beginning February 24, 2018, on weekdays at 7:30 p.m. EST.

See also
 Ultra Series - Complete list of official Ultraman-related shows
 Ultraman Ginga - Previous season of the show

References

External links
Ultraman Ginga S at Tsuburaya Productions 

2014 Japanese television series debuts
Ultra television series
Crossover tokusatsu television series
TV Tokyo original programming
2014 Japanese television series endings